Christine Sneed is an American author — the novels Little Known Facts (2013), Paris, He Said (2015), and Please Be Advised (2022), and the story collections Portraits of a Few of the People I've Made Cry (2010), The Virginity of Famous Men (2016), and Direct Sunlight (2023) — as well as a graduate-level fiction professor at Northwestern University who also teaches in Regis University's low-residency MFA program. She is the recipient of the Chicago Public Library Foundation's 21st Century Award, the John C. Zacharis First Book Award (via Ploughshares), the Society of Midland Authors Award, the 2009 AWP Grace Paley Prize for Short Fiction, and the Chicago Writers' Association Book of the Year Award in both 2011 and 2017.

Life
Born September 24, 1971, Sneed grew up in Green Bay, Wisconsin, and Libertyville, Illinois. She earned an undergraduate degree from Georgetown University, where she studied French language and literature, and a Master of Fine Arts in creative writing from Indiana University Bloomington.

Sneed's work has appeared in the anthologies The Best American Short Stories 2008, The PEN/O. Henry Prize Stories 2012, and New Stories from the Midwest 2016; the literary journals Ploughshares, New England Review, The Southern Review, Meridian, Glimmer Train, Pleiades, The Massachusetts Review, and The Greensboro Review; and The New York Times, San Francisco Chronicle, and Chicago Tribune as well as other publications.

She lives in Pasadena, California.

Works
 Direct Sunlight (TriQuarterly), to be published June 15, 2023. 
 Please Be Advised (7.13 Books), October 18, 2022. 
 The Virginity of Famous Men (Bloomsbury), September 13, 2016. 
 Paris, He Said (Bloomsbury), May 5, 2015. 
 Little Known Facts (Bloomsbury), February 12, 2013. 
 Portraits of a Few of the People I’ve Made Cry (University of Massachusetts Press), November 30, 2010. 
 The PEN/O. Henry Prize Stories 2012 (Anchor); short story "The First Wife," April 17, 2012. 
 The Best American Short Stories 2008 (Houghton Mifflin); short story "Quality of Life," October 8, 2008. 

as editor:
 Love in the Time of Time's Up (Tortoise Books), October 4, 2022.

Reviews
https://www.nytimes.com/2016/09/25/books/review/christine-sneed-virginity-of-famous-men.html?_r=0 (NYTBR, September 23, 2016)
http://www.nytimes.com/2015/06/07/books/review/paris-he-said-by-christine-sneed.html?_r=0 (NYTBR, June 5, 2015) 
http://www.nytimes.com/2013/02/24/books/review/little-known-facts-by-christine-sneed.html?pagewanted=all (NYTBR, cover review, February 24, 2013)

"Interview with the Second Wife" by Christine Sneed, The Collagist, Lori Ostlund

Awards and honors
Chicago Writers' Association Book of the Year Award (2011 and 2017)
Illinois Reads selection (2016) 
Chicago Review of Books Fiction Award, Finalist (2016)
Society of Midland Authors Award, Best Adult Fiction (2013)
21st Century Award, Chicago Public Library Foundation (2013)
Chicago Magazine'''s Best New Book by a New Author (2013) 
O. Henry Prize (2012)
John C. Zacharis Award—Ploughshares' First Book Award (2011) 
Art Seidenbaum/Los Angeles Times Book Prize, Finalist, First fiction category (2011) 
Frank O'Connor International Short Story Award, long-listed (2011)
Grace Paley Prize in Short Fiction (2009)

References

External links
http://www.christinesneed.com/
Review of The Virginity of Famous Men, Los Angeles Review of BooksChristine Sneed Reflects on Mavis Gallant, Chicago TribuneInterview with Christine Sneed, ZyzzyvaAn Interview with Christine Sneed, EPL''

Year of birth missing (living people)
Living people
American short story writers
DePaul University faculty
Indiana University Bloomington alumni
Georgetown College (Georgetown University) alumni